Jiagedaqi Airport  is a civil and forestry airport serving Jiagedaqi District, Heilongjiang Province, China.  It was first built in 1970 for fighting forest fires in the nearby Greater Khingan Mountains.  Construction to expand the airport was started in September 2009 and completed by the end of 2011, with a total investment of 368 million yuan.  The airport was opened to commercial flights on June 19, 2012.  It will continue to be used mainly for the forestry industry, with limited commercial flights.  After the expansion the airport's runway has been lengthened to 2,300 meters.

Airlines and destinations

See also
List of airports in China
List of the busiest airports in China

References

Airports in Heilongjiang
Airports established in 2012
2012 establishments in China